Wakamiyatani Dam is a gravity dam located in Tokushima prefecture in Japan. The dam is used for power production. The catchment area of the dam is 211.2 km2. The dam impounds about 1  ha of land when full and can store 94 thousand cubic meters of water. The construction of the dam was started on 1933 and completed in 1935.

References

Dams in Tokushima Prefecture
1935 establishments in Japan